Sleepyard is a psychedelic pop band from Norway formed by Oliver and Svein Kersbergen in 1994.

After a couple of demo cassette releases, the band released the minialbum “Intersounds” on their own label Orange music in 1998. This was hailed as one of the first post rock albums from Norway. 

Sleepyard released “The runner” on trust me records (2003) and contributed music to the movie Monsterthursday, which was nominated for best foreign film in the 2005 Sundance film festival.
Next album "Easy Tensions" saw the band reaching for a more mellow and richer sound. Their multi tracked vocal harmonies reminded critics of the Beach Boys and drew comparisons to the psychedelic sound of Smile. 

"Future lines" from 2009 saw the band move into a more jazzy and ambient direction.  It featured contributions from Pianist Mike Garson and Sonic Boom from Spacemen 3 

In 2010 the band collaborated with Jim Shepherd of The Jasmine Minks and released a 7" Down Tangerine Road on his Oatcake Records. It also featured Jim Shepherd singing the title track and "Only You" plus the track psychedelic pop song Dear melody which was a solo cut by Sleepyard. 

Oliver produced and co wrote a couple of tracks with Judy Dyble former vocalist for Fairport Convention during 2012. "Blue barracuda" was included on Füxa Dirty D album which came out on Rocket Girl in summer 2013. The rest did end up on the next Sleepyard album, Black Sails

"Wall Of Confusion" was a split cassette release with Devita on Lithuanian label Agharta Tapes.  It featured Sleepyard with experimental noise recordings in tribute to composer Karlheinz Stockhausen. 

Sleepyard released Black Sails on US label Global Recording Artists in March 2014. This album featured special guest musicians Judy Dyble, Geoff Leigh, Randall Nieman of Füxa and Mike Garson. Nik Turner formerly of space rock band Hawkwind on a version of The Seeds Chocolate River. This song will also be featured on an upcoming tribute album to frontman and vocalist Sky Saxon.

Discography 
Intersounds (1999) Orange Music
The Runner (2003) Trust Me Records
Easy Tensions (2006) Orange Music
Future Lines (2009) Orange Music
Down Tangerine Road 7" (2010) Oatcake Records
 Wall Of Confusion (Split release with Devita) (2013) Agharta Tapes  
 Black Sails (2014) Global Recording Artists
 Winter Crickets (2018) Global Recording Artists

References

Notes

Sources
CCAP
Trust Me Records
Sky Saxon
Judy Dyble 
Agharta Tapes

External links 
Sleepyard official website
Easy tensions review in Ink 19 Ink 19 Easy tensions review
Future lines review Future Lines review
Sleepyard Interview

Norwegian psychedelic rock music groups
Musical groups established in 1994
1994 establishments in Norway
Musical groups from Norway with local place of origin missing